The Days of Mars is the debut album from artists Delia Gonzalez & Gavin Russom.  It was released on October 10, 2005.

All the music was created by layering live takes of custom built synthesizers and other instruments.

Track listing 
 "Rise" 12.55
 "13 Moons"11.15
 "Relevée"13.32
 "Black Spring"12.57

References

2006 albums